Martin Bager (born January 14, 1982) is a Danish handballer, currently playing for Liga ASOBAL side BM Ciudad Encantada.

During his youth career, Bager made several appearances for the Danish national youth handball teams.

External links
  player info

1982 births
Living people
Liga ASOBAL players
Danish male handball players